Kenwood, one of Chicago's 77 community areas, is on the shore of Lake Michigan on the South Side of the city. Its boundaries are 43rd Street, 51st Street, Cottage Grove Avenue, and the lake. Kenwood was originally part of Hyde Park Township, which was annexed to the city of Chicago in 1889. Kenwood was once one of Chicago's most affluent neighborhoods, and it still has some of the largest single-family homes in the city. It contains two Chicago Landmark districts, Kenwood and North Kenwood. A large part of the southern half of the community area is in the Hyde Park-Kenwood Historic District. In recent years, Kenwood has received national attention as the home of former U.S. President Barack Obama.

Description
Kenwood was settled in the 1850s by wealthy Chicagoans seeking respite from the increasing congestion of the city. The first of these residents was John A. Kennicott, who built his home near the Illinois Central Railroad at 48th Street. He named the home Kenwood after his ancestral land in Scotland, and when the Illinois Central Railroad built a small depot near 47th Street, they named the station Kenwood as well. Shortly afterwards, the name Kenwood began to be applied to the whole area.

The southeastern portion of Kenwood contains the Indian Village neighborhood, which features the Chicago Landmark Powhatan Apartments and the National Register of Historic Places Narragansett. The 1902 Blackstone Library is another well-known landmark in the neighborhood.  It continues to be part of the Chicago Public Library system. The recently reopened Hyde Park Art Center, located on Cornell Avenue just north of 51st Street and East Hyde Park Boulevard, is Chicago's oldest alternative exhibition space, with an on-site school and studio.

The Hyde Park community area is to the south of Kenwood and the southern half of Kenwood (south of 47th Street) is sometimes referred to as Hyde Park-Kenwood.

In the 1890s, the Kenwood Astrophysical Observatory, established by astronomer George Ellery Hale, was located in Kenwood close to the new (at that time) University of Chicago.

Politics
The Kenwood community area has supported the Democratic Party in the past two presidential elections by overwhelming margins. In the 2016 presidential election, Kenwood cast 7,639 votes for Hillary Clinton and cast 251 votes for Donald Trump (94.19% to 3.09%). In the 2012 presidential election, Kenwood cast 8,712 votes for Barack Obama and cast 331 votes for Mitt Romney (95.63% to 3.63%).

Schools
The public schools in Kenwood are Kenwood Academy, Canter Middle School, King College Prep High School, Ariel Community Academy, William C. Reavis Math and Science Specialty School and Beula Shoesmith Elementary School.  Private Schools in Kenwood include the Ancona Montessori School, Cambridge School of Chicago, Akiba-Schechter Jewish Day School, and Hales Franciscan High School.

Notable residents
 Muhammad Ali
 Lerone Bennett, Jr. 
 Barbara Bowman
 Marc Canter
 David "Honeyboy" Edwards
 Louis Farrakhan
 Seymour Hersh, was raised at 835 East 47th Street.
 Valerie Jarrett
 Edward Levi
 Ann Marie Lipinski
 Roberta Martin, lived at 4901 S. Woodlawn Avenue.
 Gaston B. Means
 Carol Moseley Braun
 Elijah Muhammad
 Barack Obama
 Michelle Obama
 Mandy Patinkin
 Maurice Rabb
 Julius Rosenwald
 Bill Veeck
 Muddy Waters

The infamous murderers Nathan Leopold and Richard Loeb, and their victim Bobby Franks, were all residents of Kenwood.

Gallery

Notes

External links

Official City of Chicago Kenwood Community Map

Community areas of Chicago